The Balonne Highway, a state highway of Queensland, is the continuation westward of State Route 49 (Moonie Highway) from the town of St George to its termination at Cunnamulla. There are no large settlements between St George and Cunnamulla.

Upgrades

Levee bank at Bollon

Roads of Strategic Importance upgrades
The Roads of Strategic Importance initiative, last updated in March 2022, includes the following projects for the Balonne Highway.

Corridor upgrade
A lead project to upgrade the Townsville to Roma corridor, including sections of the Carnarvon, Dawson, Gregory and Balonne Highways and surrounding state and council roads, at an estimated cost of $125 million, commenced construction of some work projects in 2020. Planning continues for other projects.

St George breakdown pad
A project to construct a breakdown pad on the Balonne Highway at St George at a cost of $2.4 million is planned to be completed by late 2022. This project is targeted for "early works" by the Queensland Government.

Major intersections

See also

 Highways in Australia
 List of highways in Queensland

References

Highways in Queensland